James Noel Pittman (August 28, 1925 – October 30, 1971) was a college football coach at Tulane University and Texas Christian University.

Career
A native of Boyle, Mississippi, Pittman played at Mississippi State University. From 1966 to 1970, he served as the head football coach at Tulane, and during his tenure there he compiled a 21–30–1 record. In 1971, he served as the head football coach at TCU, where he compiled a 3–3–1 record, being credited for the 34–27 win that happened on the day of his death. He died of a heart attack on the sidelines of a game against Baylor in Waco, Texas on October 30, 1971.

Head coaching record

Notes

References

External links
 

1925 births
1971 deaths
Mississippi State Bulldogs football coaches
Mississippi State Bulldogs football players
TCU Horned Frogs football coaches
Texas Longhorns football coaches
Tulane Green Wave football coaches
Washington Huskies football coaches
People from Bolivar County, Mississippi
Sports deaths in Texas